Preakuammicine is a terpene indole alkaloid.  Preakuammicine is thought to be formed from 4,21-dehydrogeissoschizine and lead to synthesis of stemmadenine.  The enzymes involved in preakuammicine formation and those which use it as a substrate are currently unknown.

References

Tryptamine alkaloids
Indolizidines
Heterocyclic compounds with 5 rings
Methyl esters